Robert John "Bob" Lagomarsino (September 4, 1926 – February 7, 2021) was an American politician and lawyer from California who served in the United States House of Representatives. A Republican, he began his service in the United States House of Representatives in 1974 and was re-elected every two years until 1992, when he was defeated for renomination by Michael Huffington. Prior to serving in the House, Lagomarsino served in the California State Senate from 1961 until 1974, and prior to that, he served as the mayor of Ojai, California.

Early life
A native of Ventura, California, Lagomarsino was the son of Emilio Lagomarsino and Marjorie (Gates) Lagomarsino. He attended the schools of Ventura and was a 1944 graduate of Ventura High School. He served as a pharmacist mate in the United States Navy from 1944 to 1946 and was a veteran of World War II. He graduated with a bachelor of arts degree in 1950 from the University of California, Santa Barbara and in 1953 he received a J.D. from the Santa Clara University School of Law. He was admitted to the bar in 1954 and practiced law in Ventura.

In April 1958, Lagomarsino was elected to the Ojai City Council. In December 1958, his council peers chose him to serve as mayor. He held this office until resigning in late 1961 to enter the California Senate.

California State Senate
In the California Senate, Lagomarsino's most significant legislative achievements included the Garrigus-Lagomarsino Act (1963), which authorized vocational education centers in each county of the State; the California Child Anti-Pornography Act (1969); the Marine Resources Protection Act (1970); the California Wild and Scenic Rivers legislation; the Jury Reform Act (1972); the Consumer Protection Act (1972), which authorized cities to create anti-fraud units; and the Welfare Reform Act (1973). By the time he was elected to the United States Congress, the senior ranking senator from Southern California and a member of the five person Senate Rules Committee, after having served as Chairman of the Senate Committee on Natural Resources and Wildlife.

United States Congress
In 1974, Congressman Charles Teague, of what was then California's 13th congressional district, where Lagomarsino resided, died suddenly.  Lagomarsino was elected to replace Teague as the 13th district congressman in a special election in 1974. He was the only Republican in a 1974 special election to hold a district for his party.

During his service as a United States Congressman, Lagomarsino was an active member of two major House Committees:  the Foreign Affairs Committee, as the third-ranking Republican and the Committee on Interior and Insular Affairs, as the second-ranking Republican.   He was a Congressional Observer to the Geneva Arms Controls Talks and Vice Chairman of the Subcommittee on Western Hemisphere Affairs, which oversaw U.S. relations with Canada, Central America, and South America.  He was also Chairman of the National Republican Institute for International Affairs, Co-Chairman of the Congressional Task Force on Afghanistan, and a member of the Asian and Pacific Affairs Committee.  In addition, Lagomarsino served as Chairman of the POW/MIA Task Force and was House author of a measure creating the Prisoner of War Medal.

Lagomarsino made several trips abroad as a congressman.  He toured South America, the Far East, the Pacific Region, the Soviet Union, and Europe numerous times, but held a particular interest in Southeast Asia; meeting with the Laos government in 1989 and, later, the Vietnamese government in 1990, to obtain information on American POW/MIA's in Southeast Asia. He toured the Panama Canal as part of President Carter’s diplomacy and was an observer to the Panama's national elections and Kuwait invasion under President Bush. Lagomarsino also attended annual interparliamentary conferences held in Mexico and on the European continent.  
	
During his service in Washington, Lagomarsino specialized in environmental concerns, foreign affairs (particularly Latin America), and illegal drug trafficking.  He authored legislation which created the Channel Islands National Park, the Dick Smith Wilderness Area, the Los Padres National Forest, and co-authored the Drug War Bond Act and the Violent Crime and Drug Control Act.  He was a leader in efforts to open overseas markets to U.S. products and to ban transfer of strategic goods or technology. Lagomarsino maintained a voting record of 99% and took pride in voting against all proposed congressional pay raises.

Re-election defeat
Prior to the 1992 congressional elections, a congressional reapportionment plan placed Lagomarsino's residence within the congressional district of fellow Republican Elton Gallegly.  Rather than run against Gallegly, Lagomarsino chose to move to the 22nd District and run again for re-election there.  He was challenged in the Republican primary by millionaire Michael Huffington, who went on to defeat Lagomarsino by nearly seven percentage points.

California State University Channel Islands
Lagomarsino was a long-time advocate of the establishment of a state college in his native Ventura County.  His goal came to fruition in 2002, with the establishment of the California State University Channel Islands (CSUCI).  A collection of papers, memorabilia and furniture Lagomarsino had previously donated to the Ventura satellite campus of the California State University, Northridge was transitioned to CSUCI. In 2002, the university's library formally established the Robert J. and Norma M. Lagomarsino Department of Archives and Special Collections.

Post-politics
As of 2010, Lagomarsino continued to be active, serving on numerous community boards in and around Santa Barbara County and Ventura County, and on the Board of the California Center for Public Policy. He and his wife Norma (d. 2015) lived in Ventura, California, and they had three children and six grandchildren. Lagomarsino died on February 7, 2021, at his family ranch in Ojai, California.

The visitor's center at Channel Islands National Park is named after Lagomarsino.

References

External links

 
 Join California Robert J. Lagomarsino

Republican Party California state senators
University of California, Santa Barbara alumni
1926 births
2021 deaths
Santa Clara University alumni
California lawyers
People from Ojai, California
People from Ventura, California
Mayors of places in California
California city council members
Military personnel from California
United States Navy sailors
Republican Party members of the United States House of Representatives from California
United States Navy personnel of World War II
20th-century American politicians